Aurora Arias, born April 22,1962 in Santo Domingo, is a writer and journalist from the Dominican Republic, and is also an astrologer.

Biography 
Aurora Arias was born in Santo Domingo on April 22, 1962. She is a writer, journalist, feminist, astrologer, and also has studied art and psychology. She has published poetry in books 'Vivienda de pájaros' (1986) y 'Piano Lila' (1994). She has also worked with prose fiction. In 1994 she won the prize of 'Tale of House of Theater' for the work Invy's Paradise; the Editorial of the 'University of Puerto Rico' published her collection of stories 'End of the world' in the year 2000.

She was co-editor of 'Quehaceres', a publication for 'Centro de Investigación para la Acción Femenina' (CIPAF), for which she worked from 1989 to 1996.

In relation to astrology, Aurora Arias maintains, since 1997, an astrological column titled "Astral Chart", in the magazine Uno.

Works 
Vivienda de pájaros (book of poems, 1986).
Piano lila (book of poems, 1994).
Invi's Paradise y otros relatos (1998).
Fin de mundo y otros relatos (2000).
Emoticons (2007).
Parquecito (2011).
Emoticons (reedition 2015).

References

External links 
La palabra rebelada/revelada: el poder de contarnos, ediciones 'Femlibro', 2011,  / Capítulo II: Viaje en la nube de la escritura (de Aurora Arias), pp. 56-95.

Emily A. Maguire, Ciudad insana: la locura femenina en los cuentos urbanos de Aurora Arias, sitio digital 'Academia / Estudios 17:33', 2009, pp. 127-144.

Las nuevas cartografías: otra mirada a Aurora Arias, sitio digital 'La Ventana, portal informativo de la Casa de las Américas', 5 de marzo de 2010.
«La palabra revelada/rebelada: el poder de contarnos» / Compilación de historias de vida de las escritoras dominicanas Dinorah Coronado, Emelda Ramos, Ángela Hernández, Jael Uribe, Annecy Báez, Karina Rieke, Irene Santos, Aurora Arias, Revista cultural 'Vetas', 27 de octubre de 2011.

1962 births
Living people
Dominican Republic women poets
Dominican Republic journalists
Dominican Republic astrologers
People from Santo Domingo
20th-century Dominican Republic poets
20th-century women writers
21st-century Dominican Republic poets
21st-century women writers
20th-century journalists
21st-century journalists
Dominican Republic women journalists